Alnö IF is a Swedish football club located in Alnö, just outside Sundsvall in Medelpad.

Background
Alnö Idrottsförening was formed on 24 April 1924 at the Hammarstedts Cafe in Vii. The sports club has been active in skiing, wrestling, boxing, soccer and cross country running. The club currently has approximately 500 members.

Since their foundation Alnö IF has participated mainly in the middle divisions of the Swedish football league system including 24 seasons in the third tier. The club currently plays in Division 4 Medelpad which is the sixth tier of Swedish football. They play their home matches at the Släda IP in Alnö. They also use the Västhagen venue.

Alnö IF are affiliated to the Medelpads Fotbollförbund.

The ladies team has participated for 7 seasons in the Damallsvenskan, the highest ladies league between 1978 and 1984. In 1984 they qualified for the Svenska Cupen final but lost 2–5 against Jitex BK. The men's team played against S.L. Benfica in 1992 in front of 4,300 spectators.

Season to season

Attendances

In recent seasons Alnö IF have had the following average attendances:

Footnotes

External links
 Alnö IF – Official website

Football clubs in Västernorrland County
Association football clubs established in 1924
1924 establishments in Sweden